Viktoriya Tsvetanova is a Bulgarian beauty pageant titleholder who was crowned

Early life
Viktoriya Tsvetanova is Graphic Designer student of New Bulgarian University.

Pageantry

2014: International pageants
Viktoriya represented Bulgaria in Miss Exclusive of the World 2014.

References

External links
Official Facebook

Bulgarian beauty pageant winners
Living people
People from Sofia
1994 births